Talina Beiko (Ukrainian: Таліна Бейко; born 31 August 1970) is a former female tennis player from Ukraine.

Beiko played for Ukraine at the Fed Cup and has a win–loss record of 2–4.

Beiko is the mother of pro tennis player Marta Kostyuk.

ITF Circuit finals

Singles (2–3)

Doubles (1–3)

References

External links
 
 

Ukrainian female tennis players
1970 births
Living people